Port Kavkaz is a railway station in Krasnodar Krai, Russia.

History
The station was opened in 1944 to serve the new Kerch railway bridge. The complex also included construction of tracks to the bridge: from Port Kavkaz to Sennaya station and from Port Krym to Kerch.

In February 1945 the bridge was destroyed by ice.

In 1954 the Kerch ferry crossing had opened.

In 1989 the railway ferries were stopped for passenger trains, however, the station continued to work, serving freight trains and a passenger diesel train Kavkaz – Krasnodar.

In 1995 the railway ferries were stopped and the station became disused.

In 2004 new rail ferries arrived to Port Kavkaz and resumed the movement of freight trains through the Kerch Strait ferry line.

In 2007, the station became primary when sending oil cars from Russia to Armenia, replacing Ukrainian Illichivsk.

In 2008 new railway lines were built to the station.

Since 2009, the station sends cars to Bulgaria, bypassing customs procedures on the borders of Ukraine, Moldova and Romania.

Since 2015 all the trains to Crimea pass the station.

See also
 Port Kavkaz
 Port Krym

References

External links
 Station news

Railway stations in Krasnodar Krai
Railway stations in Russia opened in 1944